Klichaw District (Klichevsky raion) is a raion (district) in Mogilev Region, Belarus, the administrative center is Klichaw. As of 2009, its population was 17,246. Population of Klichaw accounts for 43.6% of the district's population.

Notable residents 
 Ignacy Hryniewiecki (1855, Basin hamlet (now Kalinaǔka village) - 1881), member of the revolutionary society Narodnaya Volya who assassinated Tsar Alexander II of Russia
 Arkadź Smolič (1891, Bacevičy village - 1938), Belarusian academic, active participant of the Belarusian independence movement and a victim of Stalin's purges

References

 
Districts of Mogilev Region